Eugene Island block 330 oil field is an oil field in the United States Exclusive Economic Zone in the Gulf of Mexico.

History
In the outer continental shelf lease sale on December 15, 1970  were offered for lease, including Eugene Island blocks. The Block 330 area was acquired by Pennzoil (now part of Royal Dutch Shell). As the Pliocene-Pleistocene sands were considered geochemically immature and wells drilled to the north of Block 330 discovered natural gas, Pennzoil expected to discover a natural gas not oil. The oil field was discovered in March 1971 while drilling the 1 OCS G-2115 well.  Approximately at the same time oil was discovered by Royal Dutch Shell in the adjoining block 331.

By the end of 1971, two platforms had been installed in the field. The first development well was drilled on Block 330 by Pennzoil's "A" platform in November 1971.  Production started in September 1972 in the block 331. During 1972 four more platforms were installed and later the number of platforms increased to nine.

From 1975 to 1980, the field was the largest producing field in the Federal outer continental shelf. Enhanced oil recovery operations started in August 1975. Water injection was used on blocks 331 and 314, and starting from December 1979 gas injection was used on block 330.

Geology
The field is an anticlinal structure on the downthrown side of a major salt diapir associated growth fault and produces from 25 Pliocene-Pleistocene delta-front sandstone reservoirs at depths from 1290 to 3600 m.  The structure was located with reconnaissance reflection seismology 2D lines recorded from 1966 to 1970, coupled with well data defined lithofacies and isopach maps indicating large delta systems.  Relative amplitude seismic profiles reveal "prominent hydrocarbon indicators" such as bright spots and flat spots, and seismic facies analysis show shingled, oblique and sigmoid reflections typical for delta-front sandstones.

Depletion rate
The oil field is best known for the controversy surrounding its depletion rate. According to a 1999 article in The Wall Street Journal:

However, Richard Heinberg provides his own figures:

The source of additional oil was analyzed as migrating through faults from deeper and older formations below the probable Jurassic and Early Cretaceous age. The oil contains biomarkers closely related to other very old oils which were long trapped in deep formations.

Eugene Island 330's fame comes from its status as an unusual anomaly. Most petroleum scientists believe that the depletion profile is adequately explained by replenishment from deeper reservoirs of normal biologically derived petroleum.

Production and ownership
Oil is exported through the Shell Pipeline Co LP operated Eugene Island Pipeline System.

 the owners of the block leases (numbers in parentheses) are Chevron Corporation (313), Royal Dutch Shell (331), Ecee, Inc (330), Palo Petroleum (337).  Arena Offshore / Chevron Corporation joint venture RIKER (338).  Arena Offshore (314).

References

External links
No Free Lunch, Part 2: If abiotic oil exists, where is it?

Gulf of Mexico oil fields of the United States